Fighter Squadron 31 (Hävittäjälentolaivue 31, HävLLv 31) is a Finnish fighter squadron located in Rissala, near Kuopio. It is the operational part of the Karelia Wing.

Organization
1st FlightFighter flight, flies F-18C/D and also trains mechanics
2nd FlightFighter flight, flies F-18C/D and trains pilots
Liaison FlightFlies Valmet Vinka, PA-31-350 Chieftain, Valmet L-90TP Redigo aircraft

External links
www.ilmavoimat.fi

31
Siilinjärvi